Olivia Harlan Dekker (born April 8, 1993) is an American sportscaster, working as a sideline reporter for ESPN College Football, the NFL on Westwood One Sports, and Big Ten Network basketball.

Early life and education
Harlan grew up in Mission Hills, Kansas. Her father is play-by-play announcer Kevin Harlan. Her grandfather is former Green Bay Packers chief executive officer Bob Harlan. She was named Miss Kansas Teen USA in 2010. She graduated from the University of Georgia in 2014.

Career
Harlan has covered SEC and ACC football for FOX Sports South and Raycom. She has co-hosted a daily Green Bay Packers training camp web series and worked as a sideline reporter for preseason games on Packers TV Network. She has been a sideline reporter for Atlanta Hawks games on FOX Sports South. With her father Kevin Harlan as play-by-play announcer and Olivia as sideline reporter, the Harlans became the first father-daughter duo to call an NFL game together. She joined ESPN in 2015. She covered World TeamTennis for CBS Sports in 2019. In 2020, she covered football games for the Big Ten Network.  In 2021, she joined BetMGM as host.

Personal life
Harlan has three brothers and sisters. She is married to professional basketball player Sam Dekker. The couple was named 2018 People of the Year by The Sheboygan Press. She serves on the board of directors for the Children's Cancer Family Foundation.

References

External links
Olivia Harlan profile  at ESPN Media Zone

1993 births
Living people
ESPN people
American sports journalists
Green Bay Packers announcers
University of Georgia alumni
Women sports commentators
National Football League announcers
College football announcers
National Basketball Association broadcasters